Pondfreaks Entertainment  is a short film production house from Hyderabad.

Pondfreaks Entertainment have formed one of the leading Short film studios in Andhra Pradesh & Telangana, India. The Studio's activities span across creative development, production and marketing the short films.

The studio has produced short movies including Coin, Infinity, Invisible fish and Bewars.

History
The Pondfreaks entertainment has started long back in 2007. The key initiators of the Studio are Karthik Gattamneni, Edward Sunny, Vijay Bhanu, Goutham Nerusu, Ajay Kiran Varma, Seshu, Vijay Kiran Varma, and Kunaal. Initially, the studio was named as "Eddykar Productions", but later it has been changed to "Pondfreaks entertainment".The team consists of alumni from Rajiv Menon MindScreen Film Institute, Satyajit ray Film & Television Institute, Annapurna College of Film and Media, ISB Hyderabad and BITS Pilani. Their filmography includes around 11 short films, which are critically acclaimed. In late 2011, Oklahoma Sooners Production (another shortfilm production studio) has merged with Pondfreaks entertainment to produce two movies and a music video: Infinity and Bewars (Films), Lost (Music Video).

Making style
Initial stages almost every shortfilm from Pondfreaks Entertainment has been shot on a Sony handycam. Later it has been upgraded with 3CCD MiniDV camcorder. F&I is the first short film from Pondfreaks Entertainment to be shot on Canon EOS 7D. Pondfreaks is the first shortfilm studio in India to try underwater shots (in Invisible fish) with Canon EOS 7D.

Technically, short films like Coin, Infinity, Bewars and Invisible fish have awe-inspiring cinematography, shot compositions and Digital Intermediate. Their technicalities in sound design and editing reflect the ingenious film-making they have developed through years.

Notable filmography

Feature films

References

Film production companies based in Hyderabad, India
2007 establishments in Andhra Pradesh
Indian companies established in 2007